The 1933 Isle of Man TT saw a double victory for Stanley Woods, who won the Junior TT Race at an average speed of , heading a top three place finish for riders from the Norton marque, followed by Tim Hunt and Jimmie Guthrie.

Teammate Frank Longman, the winner of the 1928 Lightweight TT Race, crashed at Glentramman Corner during the same race and died later of his injuries in hospital.

The 1933 Senior TT Race gave Stanley Woods another Junior/Senior double win.

Senior TT (500cc)
7 laps (264.11 miles) Mountain Course.

Junior TT (350cc)
7 laps (264.11 miles) Mountain Course.

Lightweight TT (250cc)
7 laps (264.11 miles) Mountain Course.

External links
 Detailed race results
 Isle of Man TT winners
 Mountain Course map

Isle of Man TT
1933
Isle